The , , is an old German breed of domestic chicken. It is a rare breed: in 2016 the recorded population in Germany consisted of 215 cocks and 979 hens, in the hands of 130 breeders.

History 

The Möwe derives from the traditional rural chickens of north-western Germany and north-eastern Holland, in East Friesland and West Friesland respectively. It is closely related to the Westfälische Totleger and the Braekel.

Characteristics 

It is kept in two colour varieties: silver-pencilled and gold-pencilled.

References 

 Ostfriesische Möwe
 Ostfriesische Möwe

Chicken breeds originating in Germany
Chicken breeds
Animal breeds on the GEH Red List